François Rollin (born 31 May 1953) is a French actor, comedian, author and screenwriter.

He is known for his role as King Loth of Orkney in Kaamelott, Professor Rollin in Palace, and for writing the satirical news programme Les Guignols de l'info. He is also known for one-man-shows, in which he embodies the role of a whimsical and very articulate professor, alternating surreal and absurd humour with social satire.

Filmography

 1982-1984 : Merci Bernard (TV Series)
 1988-1989 : Palace (TV Series)
 1989 : Navarro (TV Series)
 1990 : Le provincial
 1991 : Le piège (TV Movie)
 1993 : Jacques le fataliste
 1995 : Associations de bienfaiteurs (TV Series)
 1997 : L'Agence Lambert, L (TV Series)
 1999 : Je règle mon pas sur le pas de mon père
 2000 : La bostella
 2000 : Les frères Soeur
 2001 : Lacryma-Christine (Short)
 2002 : Mille millièmes
 2003 : The Car Keys
 2003 : Le Grand Plongeoir (TV Series)
 2005 : Akoibon
 2005 : How Much Do You Love Me?
 2005 : Zooloo (Short)
 2006 : Avenue Montaigne
 2006 : Momo Dub (Short)
 2006-2009 : Kaamelott (TV Series)
 2008 : Coluche: l'histoire d'un mec
 2008 : Roméro et Juliette (TV Movie)
 2008 : Chez Maupassant (TV Series)
 2010 : Les invincibles (TV Series)
 2010 : La peau de chagrin (TV Movie)
 2012 : Main dans la main
 2012 : Les Opérateurs (TV Mini-Series)
 2013 : The Stroller Strategy
 2013 : 16 ans ou presque
 2014 : Lou! Journal infime
 2014 : Le grimoire d'Arkandias
 2014 : Profilage (TV Series)
 2015 : Les nuits d'été
 2016 : Hibou
 2016 : Tamara
 2017 : Pandas in the Mist (Short)
 2018 : Bonhomme
 2019 : Mike (TV Series)

Theater
 1988 : Pendant ce temps nos deux héros, by Franck Arguillère & Yves Hirschfeld (director)
 1990 : Hirondelles de saucisson by François Rollin (actor)
 1996 : Colères by François Rollin (actor)
 2000 : L'Envol du pingouin by Jean-Jacques Vanier (director)
 2003 : Le professeur Rollin a encore quelque chose à dire by François Rollin (actor)
 2005 : Chose promise by Arnaud Tsamere (director/writer)
 2005 : Seul by Pierre Légaré (actor)
 2006 : L'Envol du pingouin by Jean-Jacques Vanier (director)
 2008 : Sophie Mounicot, c'est mon tour ! by Gérald Sibleyras & Sophie Mounicot (writer)
 2008 : L'Envol du pingouin by Jean-Jacques Vanier (director)
 2008 : Sans tambour ni tambour & Canard laqué by Trompettes de Lyon (director)
 2008 : Colères by François Rollin (actor)
 2009 : Elles by Jean-Jacques Vanier (director)
 2011 : Ici et Maintenant by Guy Carlier (director)
 2012 : Avec le temps... by Catherine Laborde (writer)
 2013 : Address Unknown (novel) by Kathrine Taylor (actor)
 2013 : No 9 by Jean-Marie Bigard (director)
 2014 : Le professeur Rollin se rebiffe by François Rollin (actor)
 2014 : S'il se passe quelque chose by Vincent Dedienne (director)
 2016 : Le professeur Rollin se re-rebiffe by François Rollin (actor)
 2016 : Tout s'arrange ! by Trompettes de Lyon (director)
 2018 : La Dame de chez Maxim by Georges Feydeau (actor)
 2018 : J'ai rien entendu mais j'ai tout compris by Tatiana Djordjevic (director)

Author
 2001 : J'ai réfléchi pour vous
 2006 : Les Grands Mots du professeur Rollin
 2007 : Les Belles Lettres du professeur Rollin
 2009 : Astier et Rollin posent les bases de la pensée moderne : entretien libre sur la transmission entre générations (with Alexandre Astier)
 2011 : Les Rollinettes
 2015 : Colères
 2015 : Les dictées loufoques du professeur Rollin
 2016 : Epîtres (with Arnaud Joyet & Arnaud Tsamere)

References

External links
 
International Standard Name Identifier

1953 births
21st-century French male actors
Living people
French comedians
People from Dunkirk
French humorists
French male film actors
French male television actors
French television writers
French male writers
Male screenwriters
Male television writers